Our Lady of Peace and Good Voyage, also known as Our Lady of Antipolo and the Virgin of Antipolo, is a 17th-century Roman Catholic wooden image of the Blessed Virgin Mary venerated in the Philippines. This Black Madonna is enshrined in Antipolo Cathedral in the Sierra Madre mountains east of Metro Manila.

The image was brought to the country by governor-general Juan Niño de Tabora from Mexico via the galleon El Almirante in 1626. His safe voyage across the Pacific Ocean was attributed to the image, which was given the title of "Our Lady of Peace and Good Voyage".  It was substantiated later by six other successful voyages of the Manila-Acapulco Galleons with the image aboard as its patroness.

The statue is one of the most celebrated Marian images in the Philippines, having been mentioned by national martyr José Rizal in his writings. From May to July each year, the image attracts millions of pilgrims from all over the country and abroad.

History
On 25 March 1626, the galleon trading ship El Almirante left Acapulco, Mexico, carrying the newly appointed governor-general of the Spanish East Indies, Don Juan Niño de Tabora, who brought with him the statue. He arrived in Manila on 18 July 1626, and the statue was brought to San Ignacio Church of the Jesuits in Intramuros. When governor Tabora died in 1632, the statue was given to the Jesuits for enshrinement in the church of Antipolo, which was then being built in the present-day barangay Santa Cruz

The beliefs and traditions conducted through Our Lady of Antipolo are of animist origins and are connected with the Tagalog male boatman sea god Maguayen, which was originally a Visayan deity, known to be a god and a goddess in the Visayas. Trade and migration between the Tagalog and Visayan instilled the beliefs of Maguayen on the animist religion of the Tagalog, which was later inputted towards Catholic beliefs on the Virgin Mary.

Claims of miracles
During construction of the Antipolo church in the 1630s, the image would mysteriously vanish several times from its shrine, only to reappear atop a tipolo (breadfruit tree; Artocarpus incisa) A plant that's native to Southeast Asia and had spread to Latin America. This was taken as a celestial sign, and the church was relocated to where the tipolo tree stood. The image's pedestal is supposedly made from the trunk of that same tipolo tree, which also gave its name to Antipolo itself.

In 1639, the Chinese rose in revolt, burning the town and the church. Fearing for the statue's safety, governor Sebastián Hurtado de Corcuera ordered its transfer to Cavite, where it was temporarily enshrined. governor Hurtado later ordered the statue removed from its Cavite shrine in 1648, and it was shipped back to Mexico aboard the galleon San Luis. At the time, the statue of a saint onboard served as a ship's patron saint or protector of the Acapulco trade.
 
The statue crossed the Pacific six times aboard the following Manila-Acapulco galleons:
 San Luis — (1648–1649)
 Encarnación — (1650)
 San Diego — (1651–1653)
 San Francisco Javier — (1659–1662)
 Nuestra Señora del Pilar — (1663)
 San José — (1746–1748)

A royal decree by Queen Isabella II on 19 May 1864 ordered that the parishes of Saint Nicholas of Tolentino be turned over to the Jesuits in exchange for the parishes  of Antipolo, Taytay and Morong, which were given to the Augustinian Recollects. The latter order thus came into possession of the image.

Second world war
In 1944, the Japanese Imperial Army invaded the town and turned it into a garrison, with the shrine being used as an arsenal. To save the image, the church's head sacristan, Procopio Ángeles, wrapped it in a thick woollen blanket and placed it in an empty petrol drum, which he then buried in a nearby kitchen.

Fighting between imperial Japanese troops and the combined American and Filipino forces drove Ángeles and other devotees to exhume the image and move it to Sitio Colaique on the border with Angono. From there, it was spirited away to the lowland Barangay Santolan in Pasig, and then to the town center of Pasig itself. The statue was then kept by Rosario Alejandro (née Ocampo), daughter of Pablo Ocampo, at the Ocampo-Santiago family residence on Hidalgo Street, Quiapo, Manila, before it was enshrined inside Quiapo Church for the remainder of the Second World War.

On 15 October 1945, the statue was translated back to its church in Antipolo, where it remains today.

Pontifical coronation
The venerated Marian statue merited a decree of pontifical coronation by Pope Pius XI via Cardinal Rafael Merry del Val on 18 June 1925, signed by the Regent of Apostolic Chancery, Vincenzo Bianchi Cagliesi and notarized by the Chancellor Guardian of the Vatican Chapter, Giuseppe Cascioli.

The image was canonically crowned by the Archbishop of Manila, Michael James O'Doherty, on 28 November 1926 in Luneta (present-day Rizal Park), Manila.

Cathedral shrine

The first missionaries in Antipolo were the Franciscans, who arrived in the vicinity in 1578. The Jesuits then followed and administered the church from 1591 until May 1768, when the decree expelling the Jesuits from Spanish lands reached Manila.

The church was greatly damaged during the Chinese uprising of 1639, the 1645 Luzon earthquake, and the earthquakes of 1824 and 1883. Notable Filipino historians such as Pedro Chirino and Pedro Murillo Velarde (also a prominent cartographer) ministered at the church.

The Diocese of Antipolo was created on 24 January 1983 and was canonically erected on 25 June 1983 at the diocese's new see, which bears the formal title of “National Shrine of Our Lady of Peace and Good Voyage-Immaculate Conception Parish”.

In 2022, Our Lady of Antipolo's shrine was declared by the Vatican as the first ever international shrine in the Philippines. It is the third such shrine in Asia and the 11th in the world. It is also the first Marian international shrine in Asia.

Pilgrimage
Pilgrimages to the image's shrine begin and peak in May, which in Catholicism is dedicated to the Virgin Mary. On 30 April—the eve of May Day—thousands of devotees from Metro Manila customarily perform the Alay Lakad (literally, “Walk Offering”), where pilgrims spend the night travelling on foot to the shrine, where they hear Mass at dawn.

The farthest official starting point of the modern pilgrimage is Quiapo Church; the custom of visiting the shrine in May, however, was already recorded by the 19th century. On 6 June 1868, a young José Rizal and his father Don Francisco Mercado, visited the shrine in thanksgiving after the boy and his mother, Teodora Alonso, survived his delivery in 1861.

Television
In December 2011, the Eternal Word Television Network programme Mary: Mother of the Philippines ran an episode showcasing the statue as the “most traveled Marian icon in the Philippines”.

Gallery

See also
Catholic Church in the Philippines
Manila Cathedral
Marian Shrines in the Philippines
Our Lady of La Naval de Manila
Our Lady of Peñafrancia
Our Lady of Manaoag
San José de Baras
Santo Niño de Cebu

References

External links

Shrine of Our Lady of Guidance
Shrine of Our Lady of Manaoag

Antipolo
Marian apparitions
Shrines to the Virgin Mary
Religion in Rizal
Catholic Church in the Philippines
Titles of Mary
Statues of the Virgin Mary